Far-right politics in Croatia refers to any manifestation of far-right politics in the Republic of Croatia. Individuals and groups in Croatia that employ far-right politics are most often associated with the historical Ustaše movement, hence they have connections to Neo-Nazism and neo-fascism. That World War II political movement was an extremist organization at the time supported by the German Nazis and the Italian Fascists. The association with the Ustaše has been called "Neo-Ustashism" by Slavko Goldstein.

The common perception is that the far right includes people who were either involved with the Independent State of Croatia (NDH) during World War II; sympathizers; and people who utilise their symbolism. The far right mainly arose from a combination of the residual hatred from the Yugoslav wars and Croatian nationalism.

Pro-Ustaša symbols and actions have been restricted by law in Croatia since 2003. The most common venue for expressing these beliefs is graffiti.

Background

The Ustaše was a Croatian right-wing ultranationalist movement founded in 1929 by Ante Pavelić. After the establishment of the 6 January Dictatorship by Alexander I of Yugoslavia, Pavelić fled to Italy where he set up his organization's headquarters. Prior to World War II the Ustaše functioned as a paramilitary and terrorist organization, as it sought the separation of Croatia from Yugoslavia into an independent state through violent means. Notably, it was involved in the assassination of King Alexander in 1934 with the assistance of the Internal Macedonian Revolutionary Organization (IMRO). The Ustaše however lacked broad support due to its radical and violent nature. When Nazi Germany invaded Yugoslavia in 1941, its territories were occupied by German, Italian and Hungarian forces. A German puppet-state, the Independent State of Croatia (NDH) was established and ruled by Pavelić and the Ustaše. During the Second World War, the Ustaše conducted genocide against Serbs, Roma and Jews within their borders. The Jasenovac concentration camp was a notorious death camp where extermination of these groups took place. After the war ended, many of the Ustaše fled to safety abroad in countries like Argentina and Spain. In 1957 Pavelić was wounded after an assassination attempt on him and died two years later from his injuries.

Several far-right political parties in Croatia trace their roots to Ante Starčević and view the Independent State of Croatia as a legitimate foundational state. Most openly declare their affiliation with the Ustaše. Across the right-wing spectrum, various common themes emerge with varying degrees of which include the desire for a Greater Croatia, a negative stance towards the ICTY, anti-Serbianism, positive view of the NDH and negative attitudes towards NATO and the European Union.

Za dom spremni ("Ready for the Homeland") was the WWII fascist salute used by the Ustaše and is considered to be the equivalent of the Nazi German Sieg heil. In some elements of Croatian society there is a narrative that claims the usage of the greeting predates the Ustaše, a claim that is rejected by the scholarly consensus. Since Croatia's independence, the salute has become "re-popularized" through public discourse by the right-wing.

Croatian far right during Yugoslavia
At the end of World War II, the Communist authorities pursued a strict set of policies which could be deemed as a form of denazification, only more similar to the Soviet style than to the American style. People who collaborated with the Ustaše were often court-martialled at the end of the war, and there were extrajudicial killings of collaborationist troops in the Bleiburg repatriations. Trials against suspected collaborators continued long after the end of the war. In the 1980s, Andrija Artuković was extradited to Yugoslavia from the United States, and prosecuted in SR Croatia where he died in a prison hospital. The secret service exercised harsh control over both citizens with links to the Ustaše and mere Croatian nationalists. UDBA continuously monitored the Croatian diaspora, and was implicated in numerous assassinations, notably that of Bruno Bušić in 1978.

In the aftermath of WWII, a guerrilla/terrorist anti-communist and Croatian nationalist insurgency group, the Crusaders, formed, and carried out terrorist acts against the new multi-ethnic communist state. Between 1962 and 1982, Croatian nationalist groups carried out 128 terror attacks against Yugoslav civilian and military targets; notably it bombed a JAT plane killing 27 people in 1972. All of these groups operated outside of Yugoslavia, given the Yugoslav regime's consolidation of power which made it difficult for them to operate inside the country.

Early independent political scene
In the process of the breakup of Yugoslavia, Croatia gained independence from the SFR Yugoslavia in the 1990s. The modern Croatia was formed long after World War II was over, and aside from occasional exceptions, there was no desire by the Croatian political elite to associate the new country with the former Independent State of Croatia, or to revisit the status of Croatia as a member of the winning side of that war.

Nevertheless, the introduction of the freedom of speech enabled public expression of far-right politics. The new mainstream politics showed significantly more courtesy to the Ustaše for their desire to make Croatia independent, but they were neither rehabilitated nor explicitly banned. Subsequently, no new laws were passed in the 1990s that specifically targeted the issues of Nazism or fascism. The primary reason for the disregard of past fascism in Croatia has been a lack of priority and care taken by the Croatian public and the mainstream politics towards the issue, because numerous other issues plagued the country at the time. The late president of Croatia, Franjo Tuđman, who had been a Partisan general who had fought the Ustaše, became a champion of reconciliation (Croatian pomirenje or pomirba), whereby Croats of all political views should unite against the shared threat from Serbia. This had the effect of also bringing pro-Ustaše Croats into the fray, their philosophy and ideas no longer taboo. Tuđman publicly stated that the Ustaša state was not only criminal in nature but also an expression of the desire of Croats to regain their independence after centuries. Such a notion could be considered true in view of Croatia's long historical struggle for independence, but does not give enough consideration to the puppet-state status of the NDH. After the war more anti-fascist-inclined people were no longer willing to set aside political differences with the more fascist-inclined.

At the time, Croatia was often accused of ignoring the crimes committed by the World War II-era fascist Ustaša regime, and of tolerating the symbols and the activities of individuals sympathetic to that regime. This has led to criticism of Croatia, particularly among Serbs. This was exacerbated with war-time propaganda for the Yugoslav wars. The antagonism between the Croats and the Serbs grew, and had become widespread by the time the Croatian War of Independence had started. The Croatian-Serbian animosity during the Yugoslav wars was viewed by some as a rivalry between the "Ustaša" and the "Chetnik", even if both of these World War II-era organizations did not actually exist at the time. To some extent, it is a consequence of wartime propaganda, in the course of which such moralistic debasement is common.

In the absence of a specific policy or laws against it, instances of pro-Ustaše sentiment and hate speech were rarely sanctioned, to the dismay of the left-leaning public, as well the Serbs of Croatia who were the most common targets.

Among the organizations formed during wartime which were most commonly associated with neo-Ustashism was the Croatian Defence Forces (Hrvatske obrambene snage, HOS), which emerged as the de facto paramilitary wing of the Croatian Party of Rights. Their symbols included dressing in black, at the time widely perceived to be reminiscent of blackshirts, and using the phrase Za dom spremni. These units, however, quickly fell out of favor with the Croatian authorities and were eliminated through more or less violent means before the end of the first phase of the war in Croatia. In recent years the HOS has gained popularity, their members making appearances during state war commemorations.

The far-right part of the Croatian political scene in the 1990s was fragmented between various right-wing political parties: primarily Croatian Democratic Union (HDZ) and Croatian Party of Rights (HSP), as well as other smaller parties such as the Croatian Christian Democratic Union (HKDU), the Croatian Party of Rights 1861 (HSP 1861) and Croatian Pure Party of Rights (HČSP).

Defacement of monuments
In the early 1990s, during the Croatian War of Independence, numerous monuments erected in honour of the Partisans have been damaged or destroyed throughout the country, and these incidents were generally not censured by the authorities at all. Furthermore, the devastation of World War II partisan monuments also often extended to those erected in honour of civilian victims of war, also with little or no intervention from the police. The defacements occurred during a period when communist parties lost power in much of Eastern Europe.

Political parties

Active 

 The Croatian Party of Rights (HSP), far-right with a blend of ultra-nationalism and free market economics. Gained 7% of votes in the 1992 Croatian parliamentary election and five seats in the Croatian parliament. Since then it has attracted less support. The HSP's military wing, the Croatian Defence Forces (HOS), participated in the Croatian War of Independence and openly displayed Ustaše symbols.
 The Croatian Pure Party of Rights (HČSP), far-right or neo-fascist and ultranationalist, founded by Ivan Gabelica and Nedeljko Gabelica. A marginal party with some representation in local municipalities. It holds an annual event on 10 April to celebrate the establishment of the NDH. It also protests the Pride parade and commemorations for Ustaše victims.
 The Miroslav Škoro Homeland Movement (DPMŠ), right-wing nationalist or far-right party founded by folk singer Miroslav Škoro. 
The coalition led by the Miroslav Škoro's far-right Miroslav Škoro Homeland Movement|Homeland Movement came third at the 2020 parliamentary election, winning 10.89% of the vote and 16 seats. The abortion debate was one of the leading topics during political debates, while the Homeland Movement advocated a ban on abortion.

Defunct 
 The Croatian Democratic Party of Rights (HDSP), extreme-right or neo-fascist, founded by Krešimir Pavelić that was active during the 1990s.
 The National Democratic League (NDL), extreme-right or neo-fascist, led by Ivan Vekić.
 Croatian Block (HB), extreme-right and militant, founded in 2004 and disbanded in 2009.

Post-war political scene

WWII Genocide Denial

In recent times, mainstream Croatian politicians, such as Stjepan Mesić, brought more focus to anti-fascist stances and veterans groups. Remembrance ceremonies at the site of Jasenovac concentration camp resumed, with support from the highest levels of government, including the right-wing HDZ under Ivo Sanader.

The World War II war crimes committed by the Ustaše had been processed in Yugoslavia, but some cases had protracted long enough to become the responsibility of the modern-day Croatian authorities. In 1999, Croatia extradited Dinko Šakić from Argentina, one of the commanders of the Jasenovac concentration camp, and he was subsequently tried and sentenced to 20 years in prison, at the time the highest penalty under Croatian law.

The conservative parties such as the Croatian Party of Rights (HSP) and the Croatian Democratic Union (HDZ) permeated in their support for extreme forms of nationalism and far-right ideas. This has been particularly apparent in the latter, which has a large membership and voter base and appeals to a broad spectrum of right-wing voters.

The two-time prime minister Ivo Sanader of HDZ came to power after promoting himself as an avid advocate of Croatian general Mirko Norac in 2001. The far-right position with regard to war crimes committed in the Croatian war of independence has been one of a general denial - the Croatian side is seen as inherently not responsible for any crimes because its role in the war is one of a victim. This view is the extreme form of the position taken by the Supreme Court of Croatia, which allows "pursuit of a legitimate goal of defending one's country against an armed aggression" to be considered a mitigating circumstance in war crimes trials. In general, with respect to processing war crimes, the Croatian Government (mostly under HDZ) has had a rather spotty record for processing those committed by Croats. Pressure from the European Union helped rectify this. After Sanader and HDZ were elected in 2003, Norac was prosecuted to the fullest extent of the law. Croatia has also been cooperating with the ICTY in the legal prosecution of all persons accused of war crimes, which has included Croatian officers, notably Ante Gotovina, who was acquitted of all charges by the ICTY on 16 November 2012.

Parties like the Croatian Party of Rights which are most commonly associated with Ustašism generally aren't able to attract support from more than a few percent of the population (HSP coalition won 6.4% of the national popular vote in the 2003 election and 3.5% in the 2007 election). In recent times, the HSP's image of "pro-Ustaša" was repetitively shunned by its leaders in an attempt to sway more votes. The Croatian Pure Party of Rights openly praises the Ustaše regime, though the party does not meet the minimum number of votes needed to enter Parliament.

On 11 July 2003 the Ivica Račan coalition government passed amendments to the penal code which outlawed hate speech, in a new section titled Praising fascist, Nazi and other totalitarian states and ideologies or promotion of racism and xenophobia. 
The law is not perfectly applied, evidenced by the examples of regular public display of Ustasha memorabilia by the group "Hrvatski domobran" from Zadar that only recently started to get sanctioned by the police.

On 20 June 2006 Croatian prime minister Ivo Sanader issued a message ahead of the Anti-Fascist Struggle Day (an official holiday in Croatia), in which he rejected extremism and radicalism, and said that "antifascism was a commitment weaved into the foundations of independent, democratic Croatia".

Croatia has no laws against historical revisionism or Holocaust denial. This can be attributed to the change of political system, and the change in the entire system of values as the country became independent. Revisionism was not frowned upon because priority was placed on the re-evaluation of history as recorded during the Communist era, which was therefore deemed almost implicitly tainted, because it systematically omitted or misrepresented issues related to what was perceived to be Croatian nationalism. On the other hand, the revision of history books often went too far in making them increasingly focused on Croatian national issues, even with far-right interpretations of various World War II events. The re-examination of the number of victims of the Independent State of Croatia, particularly the Jasenovac concentration camp and Genocide of Serbs, was fairly common, as well as fairly controversial. Statistical research such as that by Vladimir Žerjavić indicated serious flaws with Yugoslav data, whose sources had been kept secret until 1989.

Croatia's far-right often advocates the false theory that Jasenovac was a "labour camp" where mass murder did not take place. Among them is the far-right NGO "The Society for Research of the Threefold Jasenovac Camp" which also claims that the camp was used by the Yugoslav authorities following the war to imprison Ustasha members and regular Home Guard army troops until 1948, then alleged Stalinists until 1951. Members of the organization includes public figures such as journalist Igor Vukić, Catholic priest Stjepan Razum and academic Josip Pečarić. The ideas promoted by its members have been amplified by mainstream media interviews and book tours. Vukić's book "The Jasenovac Lie Revealed" prompted the Simon Wiesenthal Center to urge Croatian authorities to ban such works, noting that they "would immediately be banned in Germany and Austria and rightfully so". Croatian filmmaker Jakov Sedlar also peddled this theory in his documentary Jasenovac – The Truth, bringing accusations of holocaust and genocide denial from organisations representing the ethnic groups that were the primary victims of the camp.

In November 2016 in Jasenovac, a plaque with the slogan "Za dom spremni" was unveiled.

Graffiti

Far-right extremist graffiti in Croatia often targets ethnic Serbs, Roma and homosexuals.

The conflation of modern and obsolete nationalist themes sometimes produces bizarre inconsistencies, as shown at picture on the right: at the time when the ICTY wanted Croatian general Janko Bobetko, the right-wing part of the public was adamant in its demands to prevent that, and some extremist painted graffiti saying so, together with neo-fascist symbols. At the same time, Bobetko was quite clearly not a neo-fascist himself, because his family was killed by the Ustaše, and he fought against them.

Names of squares and streets
A square in the central part of Zagreb had been named the "Square of the victims of fascism" (Trg žrtava fašizma) because during World War II, over sixteen thousand people had been deported via the square to concentration camps. In the early 1990s, this square was renamed to "Square of great Croats" (Trg hrvatskih velikana). This decision was later reverted in December 2000 during Milan Bandić's mayoralty of Zagreb.

In several Croatian cities, streets were renamed after Mile Budak, a prominent Ustaša ideologist, on the basis that he was otherwise a writer. The moves to hail Budak this way, were supported by 120 university professors, scholars, and other public figures. Conversely, the leftist newspaper Feral Tribune regularly satirized the Mile Budak streets, and its journalists explicitly criticized this trend.

The renaming of streets and squares after Budak (and other Ustaša-related people) has mostly been reversed by recent governments. In 2003, Ivo Sanader's government decided to finally deal with the issue which resulted in a decision to rename all the streets bearing Budak's name. In 2004, a plaque commemorating Budak's birth in the village of Sveti Rok was removed by the same authorities. Numerous local authorities however refused to follow up with the renames or delayed them.

On 6 October 2009, the Croatian extreme right-wing NGO, the Croatian Cultural Movement (HUP), publicly declared its intention to erect a monument in honour of former Ustaše leader Ante Pavelić in Zagreb adjacent to the capital's centre square. The Israeli director of the Simon Wiesenthal Center slammed the proposed monument as a falsification of history and an insult to the memory of the victims of the NDH. No such monument was actually erected.

Popular culture

In the world of popular culture, the pop/folk/rock singer  Marko Perković (Thompson) caused a scandal when the media obtained a copy song Jasenovac i Gradiška Stara allegedly sung by him. Perković was reportedly not prosecuted for this due to uncertainty as to whether it was really he who sang the song. He has appeared on public television, and can still sometimes be seen on it, even though mainstream TV stations do tend to avoid him in order to avoid controversy. His concerts regularly attract the far-right crowd.

It has been widely alleged that he achieved such large attendances with the support of right-wing political organizations who helped rally people to the concerts. He has been banned from performing in Netherlands and other states that do not allow display of Nazi symbols and celebration of the Holocaust, although his group (Thompson) performed at SS Cyril and Methodius Roman Catholic church in Manhattan in November 2007, despite well-reported controversy and criticism from the Simon Wiesenthal Center.

Thompson himself has denied he has anything to do with Nazism numerous times, and called the campaign against him cheap propaganda, saying he was merely a proud Croatian.

Catholic clergy
A part of the Catholic clergy in Croatia openly praises the Ustaše regime and denies any wrongdoing from the side of Croats and Catholic Church. Praise for the regime is primarily expressed through commemorations for Ante Pavelić on 28 December, his birthday. Catholic representatives do not attend Holocaust commemorations but they regularly attend Bleiburg commemorations.

Controversy was caused in June 2008 when Croatian military bishop Juraj Jezerinac sang a song named Bijeli golubovi by Marko Perković Thompson, the controversial singer mentioned above, during a sermon in a church in Vukovar. The song contained also the NDH motto "Za dom spremni".

Simon Wiesenthal Center director Efraim Zuroff complained to the Croatian president Stjepan Mesić about the funeral of Dinko Šakić, one of the leaders of the army of the Independent State of Croatia, who died in July 2008. At that funeral, Croatian Dominican priest pater Vjekoslav Lasić held a speech in which he said that "the court that indicted Dinko Šakić indicted Croatia and Croatians", and that "every Croat should be proud of Šakić's name".

Sports

Ultranationalist Croats have shouted the slogan "Kill the Serb" during some sporting events. According to some Croatian media, a group of youths chanted this during a concert by Marko Perković Thompson.

In January 2006, the Ustasha song "Jasenovac i Gradiška Stara" was played publicly during the interval of an international club volleyball match. Officials later attributed the incident to a single individual, and the police did not intervene.

During a friendly 2006 match between Croatia and Italy in Livorno, a group of some 200 Croatian fans arranged themselves into a "human swastika" formation, with many also performing Nazi salutes, allegedly in response to leftist Italian fans jeering at the Croatian national anthem and waving Yugoslav communist flags. UEFA penalized the Croatian Football Federation for the incident.

In 2007, Croatian football fans formed the letter U in a stadium during a match in Bosnia and Herzegovina.

In October 2007, the Croatian newspaper Slobodna Dalmacija reported that NK Imotski's official clothing items featured Ustaša-related symbols (The letter U and the Independent State of Croatia-resembling coat of arms inside the letter. That was, in fact, the logo of the club's leading sponsor, the edile company gUj (meaning "Gojko Und Jure"). Some historians and critics claim the symbols display is an open praising of the Ustaše. The club's president, Nediljko Tolo, said: "As long as the sponsor finances our club, we will carry those symbols on our dresses". In early November 2007, the Croatian Second League Association announced that NK Imotski violated FIFA, Croatian Football Federation rules and laws of the Republic of Croatia. NK Imotski had to end a sponsorship deal with gUj until the company changes its logo. NK Imotski had to find new uniforms for the players and remove all gUj advertisements around the stadium.

In November 2007, it was reported that members of the Hajduk Split supporters' group, Torcida Split, were wearing black T-shirts featuring the  words "Hajduk jugend" (alluding to Hitlerjugend) in Fraktur and an eagle atop Hajduk's logo (resembling a Nazi Party symbol). The T-shirts were also being sold on Torcida's website. Stipe Lekić, the secretary of Torcida said to reporters that "Torcida has always been leaning to the right", but rejecting accusations that the T-shirts have connections with Nazism. He said that he was wearing the T-shirt because he liked the symbols.

Also in November 2007, a swastika appeared on Osijek's Gradski vrt football field, together with the slogan "Play, fags!" That was, reportedly done before the match with Međimurje. NK Osijek's and their Kohorta fan association condemned the acts.

In June 2012, the Croatian and German football federations were fined for singing songs associated with Nazism and wearing Nazi symbols.

In November 2013, after the FIFA World Cup 2014 Qualification match between Croatia and Iceland, the Croatian defender of Australian descent, Josip Šimunić, reportedly celebrated and motivated the crowd with the Ustashe chant "Za dom, Spremni" upon Croatian qualification to the 2014 FIFA World Cup. Simunic was disciplined by FIFA in December with a ten-match suspension and a fine of CHF 30,000.

Croatian Wikipedia

In September 2013 complaints about right-wing bias of administrators and editors on the Croatian Wikipedia arose. Those complaints were already present, but they started receiving media attention after the launch of a Facebook page titled Razotkrivanje sramotne hr.wikipedije (Exposing the shameful Croatian Wikipedia) whose creators warned the media about the bias. Croatia's Minister of Science, Education and Sports, Željko Jovanović, called for pupils and students in Croatia to avoid using the Croatian Wikipedia. Snježana Koren, a historian at the Faculty of Humanities and Social Sciences, University of Zagreb, has judged the disputed articles as "biased and malicious, partly even illiterate". She further added that "These are the types of articles you can find on the pages of fringe organizations and movements, but there should be no place for that on Wikipedia", expressing doubts on the ability of its authors to distinguish good from evil. Koren concludes that the ulterior motive of such writings is to rehabilitate the Independent State of Croatia, a Nazi Germany puppet state, and that "there is no other way to characterize such efforts than as Ustashe movement".

See also
 List of neo-Nazi organizations
 Anti-Serb sentiment

References

External links
 Ustaški pokret

 
Political movements in Croatia
Politics of Croatia
Croatia
Political history of Croatia
Far-right politics in Europe
Croatian nationalism
Croatian irredentism
Anti-immigration politics in Europe
Fascist movements
Anti-Islam sentiment in Europe